Katzeb (kamarband, Kayabandh, Cummerbund) was an article of dress encircling the body, at the waist with ends hanging in the front. It was a kind of sash also called Patka.

Name 
Katzeb is a compound word. The Sanskrit word Kati means waist, and Zeb in Persian means adorn. Mughals wore it over the Jama (coat). The Katzeb is a girdle named by the third Mughal emperor Akbar who was very fashion enthusiastic and gave a new name to many contemporary costumes. These are described in Ain-i-Akbari by Abu'l-Fazl ibn Mubarak.

Court costume 
Katzeb was a small rectangular piece of cloth but it was an essential garment of the dress that includes a jama (a coat), shawl, turban tanzeb (trouser). There are many Mughal paintings of the emperors with a sword or dagger tucked in Katzeb.

Styles 
The katzeb is simple cloth belt like garment possible with many variants such as  plain, laced, embroidered, brocaded or printed.

See also 
Jama (coat)
Farzi (coat)

References 

Costumes
Indian clothing
Mughal clothing